The Comanche Peak Limestone is a geologic formation in Texas. It preserves fossils dating from the Early Cretaceous (Albian).

See also
 List of fossiliferous stratigraphic units in Texas
 Paleontology in Texas

References

External links
 

Limestone formations of the United States
Cretaceous geology of Texas